King Yang was the 7th king of Mahan confederacy. He reigned from 73 BCE to 58 BCE. His true name was Hyo. He was succeeded by Won of Samhan (Won Wang).

References

See also 
 List of Korean monarchs
 History of Korea

Monarchs of the Mahan confederacy
1st-century BC Korean people